Chahida Ben Fraj Bouraoui, (born 1 September 1960 in Monastir, Tunisia) is an engineer, politician and deputy of the Assembly of the Representatives of the People as a representative of the Ennahda Movement. She was Secretary of State for Housing from 24 December 2011 to 29 January 2014, with Mohamed Salmane, Minister of Infrastructure and Environment.

Life
She has a degree in civil engineering. From 2005, she was director of training for the Ministry of Infrastructure. From 2004 she was a member of the board of Tunisia Société Nationale Immobilière.

See also 
 Jebali Cabinet
 Laarayedh Cabinet

References

External links
Who's Who

Tunisian engineers
1960 births
Living people
People from Monastir Governorate